ZigWheels.com is an automotive and motorcycling website based in India. ZigWheels provides automotive industry news, reviews and advice to consumers. Earlier a part of Times Internet, a subsidiary of the Times of India Group, ZigWheels was acquired by CarDekho, a subsidiary of GirnarSoft, signalling consolidation in the online auto classifieds space.

In 2015, Zigwheels expanded to multiple South East Asian markets as well, some notable expansions include ZigWheels Philippines and Oto Singapore.
 
ZigWheels was awarded the most popular automotive website of the year in 2013.

References

Automotive websites
Indian news websites
Publications with year of establishment missing